Beverley is an unincorporated community in Saskatchewan.

Swift Current No. 137, Saskatchewan
Unincorporated communities in Saskatchewan